The Lisenser Fernerkogel (or Lüsener Fernerkogel)  is a mountain in the Stubai Alps of Austria.

Routes 
From the Franz Senn Hütte hut it is approximately 3½ hours mostly over glaciers and snow, with a small (100 m) easy rock scramble at the end.

Close to, and can be combined with, the Rotgratspitze and Lisenser Spitze.

External links
 https://web.archive.org/web/20040129125605/http://www324.ws1.inname.net/bergtouren/touren_tirol/stubaier_alpen/fernerkogel/fernerkogel.htm - in German

Mountains of Tyrol (state)
Mountains of the Alps
Stubai Alps